Birks Bridge is a traditional stone-built bridge over the River Duddon in the English Lake District, in  Dunnerdale-with-Seathwaite, Cumbria, standing at Grid Reference .

History and construction
The bridge was built around the 18th century, with voussoirs and inbuilt drainage, and became a listed building in 1990.

Aspect

Birks Bridge is a packhorse bridge of outstanding beauty, even for Lakeland.  Hunter Davies described how "the hump-back stone bridge seems itself to be a work of nature, blending and melding so well with the rocks either side". Wainwright considered this a tribute to the artistry of craftsmen of former times.

See also
Listed buildings in Dunnerdale-with-Seathwaite
Ashness Bridge
Harter Fell (Eskdale)
Slater's Bridge

References

External links 
 Birks Bridge, Duddon Valley

Bridges in Cumbria
Grade II listed bridges
South Lakeland District